Epiparachma is a monotypic snout moth genus. It was described by Hans Georg Amsel in 1956, and contains the species Epiparachma notabila. It is found in Venezuela.

References

Chrysauginae
Monotypic moth genera
Moths of South America
Pyralidae genera
Taxa named by Hans Georg Amsel